Daman is the capital city of the Indian union territory of Dadra and Nagar Haveli and Daman and Diu. It is a municipal council situated in the Daman district of the union territory.

Daman Ganga River divides Daman into two parts — Nani-Daman (Nani meaning "small") and Moti-Daman (Moti meaning "big"). Despite its name, Nani-Daman is the larger of the two parts, while the old city is mainly in Moti-Daman. This holds most of the important entities like the major hospitals, supermarkets, and major residential areas. Vapi, Gujarat is the nearest city to Daman.

History 

The Portuguese Captain-Major Diogo de Melo arrived at the Daman shore by chance in 1523 while sailing towards Ormuz. He was caught in a violent storm and had his boat blown towards the coast of Daman. Shortly after, it was acquired as a Portuguese colony for over 400 years. A larger fort was built in Moti Daman in the 16th century to guard against the Mughals, who ruled the area until the Portuguese arrived. It stands today, most of it preserved in its original form. Today the majority of the municipal government offices are inside the fort.

Daman was incorporated into the Republic of India in December 1961 after an attack and invasion by the Indian Army. A battle ensued with the hopelessly outnumbered (10:1) Portuguese garrison, who were forced to surrender. The battle left four Indians dead and 14 wounded; Portuguese casualties were 10 dead and two wounded.

Demographics 
According to the 2011 census Daman District, India has a population of 191,173. This gives it a ranking of 592nd in India (out of a total of 640). Its population growth rate over the decade 2001-2011 was 69.256%. Daman has a sex ratio of 533 females for every 1,000 males, and a literacy rate of 88.06%.

Climate 
Daman has a tropical savanna climate (Köppen Aw) with two distinct seasons: a long, sunny dry season from October to May and a hot, very humid, and extremely wet monsoon season from June to September. Almost no rain falls during the dry season. With milder mornings and lower humidity especially up to the middle of March, this is by far the most comfortable time of the year.

The monsoon season, though relatively short, is extremely wet. Along with the very high humidity and heavy rain every afternoon, travel is difficult and uncomfortable.

Places of interest 
Nani Daman Fort (Jeronimo fort)
Jain Temple: This 18th-century Jain temple is in the northern region of Nina Damon Fort and is dedicated to Mahavira Swami. It is built with white marble. The walls have glass covers with 18th-century murals that represent the life of Mahavira Swami.
Fort of Moti Daman 
Jampore Beach
Devka Beach
Church of Bom Jesus
Daman Freedom Memorial
Moti Daman Fort

Indian Coast Guard 

Indian Coast Guard Air Station, Daman is the premier air station of the Coast Guard with all the airfield facilities, air traffic control and other allied air traffic services. It is equipped with state-of-the-art airport surveillance radar (ASR), precision approach path indicator (PAPI), Doppler very high frequency omnidirectional radio range (DVOR) – distance measuring equipment (DME) and nondirectional beacon (NDB), as navigational aids. This air station provides ATC and parking facilities to defence as well as civil aircraft.

Schools and colleges 
Coast Guard Public School, Nani Daman
Swami vivekanad English &  Hindi medium school, dalwada, daman
Institute of our lady of Fatima, Convent, Moti Daman
 Podar Jumbo Kids, Daman (preschool)
Sunrise Champs school, Mashal Chowk, Nani Daman 
Vaidik Dental college campus, Salwaar, Nani Daman 
Shrinathji School, Varkund, Nani Daman
Divya Jyoti English High & Higher Secondary School, Dabhel, Daman
Divya Jyoti Hindi Medium School, Dabhel, Daman
MGM High School, Nani-Daman (Sarvajanik High School)
Government Higher Secondary School, Nani Daman
Government Higher Secondary School, Moti Daman
Government Polytechnic Daman
Shree Machchi Mahajan English Medium School, Nani Daman
Stella Maris English Medium High School, Daman
AIM English School, Moti Daman
Government College, Nani Daman
Government Primary School, Devka Mangelwad, Nani Daman
Holy Trinity English medium high school, Dunetha, Daman
Jawahar Navodaya Vidyalaya, Daman

References

External links 

Official Website
Daman Tourism Website

 
Cities and towns in Daman district, India
Indian union territory capitals